Senator Kenan may refer to:

Augustus Holmes Kenan (1805–1870),Georgia
James Kenan (1740–1810), North Carolina State Senate
Thomas S. Kenan (1771–1843), North Carolina

See also
Senator Keenan (disambiguation)